General McQueen may refer to:

Adolph McQueen (fl. 1970s–2010s), U.S. Army major general
John C. McQueen (1899–1985), U.S. Marine Corps lieutenant general
Keith McQueen (1923–2000), British Army major general

See also
Thomas MacQueen (1792–1840), British Army general